Phloeosinus dentatus is a species of crenulate bark beetle in the family Curculionidae.  It is found in North America.

References

Further reading

 
 
 
 

Scolytinae
Beetles described in 1826